John Gardyne of Lawton and Middleton (died after 1704) was a Scottish laird. He served in the Convention of the Estates of Scotland as member for the county of Angus in 1667. 

He was the son of David Gardyne, 10th Laird of Gardyne and last Gardyne of that Ilk, and  his wife Janet Lindsay, daughter of Sir David Lindsay, Lord Edzell, a judge and the son of David Lindsay, 9th Earl of Crawford. John Gardyne of Middleton was married to Elizabeth Arbuthnott and they had issue reputedly, 3 sons and 18 daughters.

References
 

Members of the Convention of the Estates of Scotland 1667
People from Angus, Scotland
Year of birth unknown
Year of death unknown